The Dade City Woman's Club is a historic women's club building located at 37922 Palm Avenue in Dade City, Florida. Built in 1926, the building has a Prairie School design with Mediterranean Revival influences. The interior includes meeting rooms, dining rooms, and a stage, all typical features of women's clubs of the era. The club hosted both meetings and local events such as school dances and political debates.

The building was added to the National Register of Historic Places on October 13, 2003. It is part of the Clubhouses of Florida Woman's Clubs Multiple Property Submission.

References

Clubhouses on the National Register of Historic Places in Florida
Prairie School architecture in Florida
Buildings and structures completed in 1926
Buildings and structures in Pasco County, Florida
Women's clubs in Florida
National Register of Historic Places in Pasco County, Florida